Dean Phipps is a New Zealand sailor who has competed in eight America's Cups.

Phipps was a part of the Victory ’83 challenge for the 1983 Louis Vuitton Cup and sailed on Australia IV during the 1987 Defender Selection Series. He was the backup bowman for New Zealand Challenge in the 1992 Louis Vuitton Cup.

He sailed on Steinlager 2 during the 1989–90 Whitbread Round the World Race and also competed in the 1993-94 edition, on board Winston.

He sailed with Team New Zealand on NZL 32 during the 1995 America's Cup victory and 2000 America's Cup defence.

Phipps then joined Alinghi, and was part of their 2003 and 2007 America's Cup victories and their 2010 America's Cup loss, although he was not on board the boat. He sailed the 2010 Louis Vuitton Trophy Dubai with Oracle Racing.

He was inducted into the America's Cup Hall of Fame in 2010.

He has also sailed in four Sydney to Hobart Yacht Race, four Fastnet Race, and two Newport Bermuda Races.

References

Living people
New Zealand male sailors (sport)
1983 America's Cup sailors
1987 America's Cup sailors
Volvo Ocean Race sailors
Team New Zealand sailors
1995 America's Cup sailors
2000 America's Cup sailors
Alinghi sailors
2003 America's Cup sailors
2007 America's Cup sailors
1992 America's Cup sailors
Oracle Racing sailors
Year of birth missing (living people)